Gogol is a teenage fictional detective character created by Bengali writer Samaresh Basu especially for children. Few Gogol's stories were adapted into films.

Character 
As per the writer Samaresh Basu, Gogol's father Samiresh Chatterjee, was a fan of Russian writer Nikolai Gogol and hence, named his only child as Gogol Chatterjee. Gogol's real name is Uday Kumar Chatterjee. Basu crafted Gogol as an intelligent boy, obedient to his parents but extremely curious about anything happening around him. He often finds himself entangled in a web of mystery. His curiosity drives him to solve mysteries, some of which are life-threatening. This fictional detective character is still very popular for children. In some cases, a private investigator from Naihati, Mr. Ashok Thakur, helps and saves Gogol from the criminals.

Stories 
Bose writes lot of short stories and novels based on Gogol's adventures. Most of the Gogol series were published in Bengali child magazines like Anandamela, Shuktara etc.
Idurer Khut Khut
 Aayna Niye Khelte Khelte
 Adrishya Manusher Haatchani
 Buno Hati'r Bandhuttwo
 Bhul Barite Dhuke
 Bondho Ghorer Awaj
 Chora Hati Shikari
 Durger Garhkhai Er Durghatono
 Garadheen Jaanalay Rakkhos
 Gogol Kothay?
 Gogoler Keramati
 Gogoler Royraja Uddhar
 Harano Buddhagupti
 Indurer Khut khut
 Jonaki Bhuter Bari
 Kairong Moth Er Gogoler Kando
 Mahishmardini Uddhar
 Pashchimer Balcony Theke
 Rajdhani Expresser Hatya Rahasya
 Ratna Rahasya O Gogol
 Sonali Parer Rahashya
 Sei Garir Khonje
 Shimulgarer Khune Bhut
 Telephone Aaripatar Bipad

Films 
 In 2013, a Bengali movie, Goyenda Gogol, was made based on the story Sonali Parer Rahashya. This movie was directed by Arindam Dey.
 In 2014, another film, Gogoler Kirti was released. It was directed by Pompy Ghosh Mukherjee based on the story Gogoler Royraja Uddhar and Mahishmardini Uddhar. 
 In both the movies, the character of Gogol was played by child actor Ahijit Ghosh.

References 

Fictional Bengali people
Fictional Indian people
Fictional amateur detectives